In Dutch sports, The Big Three (or The Traditional Top Three) is the nickname for the three most successful rivalling football clubs in the Netherlands: Ajax from Amsterdam, Feyenoord from Rotterdam and PSV from Eindhoven. Collectively they amounted for 73 of the 130 Dutch Football Championships ever played, and 59 of a possible 67 championships since the introduction of professional football in 1954. The three clubs generally end up sharing the top three positions and contending for the title. None of them have been relegated from the Eredivisie either, having been participants in all editions since Dutch football was merged into a single top-level competition in the 1956–57 season; the lowest position any of them has earned is 14th, PSV, while Ajax and Feyenoord's lowest positions have been 13th.

Several other clubs outside the big three have won the Dutch league, with HVV Den Haag having the fourth most national titles behind the Big Three in the Netherlands with 10 in total; however, the last time they won was in 1914.

After the Eredivisie was established in 1956, AZ Alkmaar (2 times), DOS, Sparta Rotterdam, DWS and FC Twente were the only other champions, outside the “Big Three” clubs.

Ajax, PSV and Feyenoord are the only Dutch clubs which have won European and international competitions. Feyenoord won the European Cup in 1970 and the UEFA Cup in 1974 and 2002, as well as the Intercontinental Cup in 1970. Ajax won the European Cup three consecutive times in 1971, 1972 and 1973, and a fourth time after it was rebranded to the UEFA Champions League in 1995. They also won the UEFA Cup in 1992, the UEFA Cup Winners' Cup in 1987, the Intercontinental Cup of 1972 and 1995, as well as the European Super Cup in 1972, 1973 and 1995. PSV also won the European Cup of 1988 and the UEFA Cup in 1978.

Besides the “Big Three”, FC Twente and AZ Alkmaar also played in UEFA Cup finals, in 1975 and 1981. However, they were both runners-up to Borussia Möchengladbach and Ipswich Town respectively.

Trophies 

{| class="wikitable sortable"
|-
! rowspan="2" style="width:5%;" |Team
! colspan="4" style="width:17%;" |Major National
! colspan="7" style="width:19%;"|International
|-
! style="width:3%;" class="sortable"|ED
! style="width:1%;" class="sortable"|KB
! style="width:3%;" class="sortable"|JCS
! style="width:2%;" class="sortable"|National Total
! style="width:7%;" class="sortable"|CL
! style="width:7%;" class="sortable"|CWC
! style="width:6%;" class="sortable"|EL 
! style="width:4%;" class="sortable"|USC
! style="width:7%;" class="sortable"|IC
! style="width:7%;" class="sortable"|International Total
! style="width:7%;" class="sortable|Grand Total 
|-
|Ajax || align=center|36 || align=center|20 || align=center|9 || align=center|65  || align=center|4 || align=center|1 || align=center|1 || align=center|2|| align=center|2 || align=center|10 || align=center|75
|-
|PSV Eindhoven || align=center|24 || align=center|10 || align=center|12 || align=center|46 || align=center|1|| align=center|- || align=center|1 || align=center|-|| align=center|- || align=center|2 || align=center|48
|-
|Feyenoord || align=center|15 || align=center|13 || align=center|4 || align=center|32 || align=center|1|| align=center|- || align=center|2 || align=center|- ||  align=center|1 || align=center|4 || align=center|36
|} Last updated following the 2021–22 Eredivisie. ''

Footballers who have played for all three clubs
  Ruud Geels (Feyenoord 1966–1970, Ajax 1974–1978, PSV 1981–1982)
  Ronald Koeman (Ajax 1983–1986, PSV 1986–1989, Feyenoord 1995–1997)

Managers who have managed all three clubs
  Hans Kraay Sr. (Ajax 1974–1975, Feyenoord 1982–1983, PSV 1986–1987)
  Ronald Koeman (Ajax 2001–2005, PSV 2006–2007, Feyenoord 2011–2014) (The only football manager to play and manage the Big Three.)

See also 
 Big Three (Belgium)
 Big Three (Costa Rica)
 Big Three (Greece)
 Big Three (Peru)
 Big Three (Portugal)
 Big Three (Turkey)
 Big Twelve (Brazilian football)

References 

Football in the Netherlands
AFC Ajax
Feyenoord
PSV Eindhoven